Comamonas thiooxydans is a Gram-negative, rod-shaped bacterium from the genus  Comamonas and  family  Comamonadaceae, which was isolated from a sulfur spring. C. thiooxydans has the ability to oxidize thiosulfate.

Comamonas sp. strain E6 (NBRC 107749), isolated from soil, is known for its ability to oxidize phthalate isomers such as terephthalic acid. Its genome has been sequenced as GCF_001010305.1. Based on this genome, the GTDB assigns strain E6 to Comamonas thiooxydans.

References

External links
Type strain of Comamonas thiooxydans at BacDive -  the Bacterial Diversity Metadatabase

Comamonadaceae
Bacteria described in 2011